Antonio Šišić (born 29 March 1983 in Zagreb) is a Croatian football manager and former football goalkeeper.

Early life

As a player, Šišić has played for his hometown club Dinamo Zagreb for the club's youth squad, Croatia Sesvete and NK Lokomotiva as a goalkeeper.

Managerial career
In 2010 Šišić joined Miroslav Blažević as a member of his coaching staff. of the Chinese Olympic team, but was resigned together with the complete coaching staff after failure in qualification to the 2012 Summer Olympics in 2011.

In 2011 Iran Pro League side Mes Kerman signed a contract with Miroslav Blažević as a head coach and Šišić joined in as an assistant coach.

In 2012 Antonio moved to Malaysia to join Kedah FA as an assistant coach  to Marijo Tot, but in 2013, Šišić stepped up into the caretaker head coach role.

For the season 2014 Šišić was assigned to Malaysian Premier League team Johor Darul Takzim FC as goalkeeping and fitness coach together with his compatriots Rajko Magić and Bojan Hodak. They won the 2014 Malaysia Super League and qualified for the AFC Cup, but after JDT was beaten by Perak, Šišić did not renew his contract 

In 2017 accepted an offer to become assistant coach to Marijo Tot and head coach of 2nd team of China League One side Zhejiang Yiteng F.C.

References

1983 births
Living people
Footballers from Zagreb
Association football goalkeepers
Croatian footballers
NK Croatia Sesvete players
NK Lokomotiva Zagreb players
Croatian football managers
GNK Dinamo Zagreb managers
Expatriate football managers in China
Croatian expatriate sportspeople in China
Croatian expatriate sportspeople in Iran
Croatian expatriate sportspeople in Malaysia
Association football goalkeeping coaches